The men's shot put event  at the 1992 European Athletics Indoor Championships was held in Palasport di Genova on 29 February 1992.

Results

References

Results

Shot put at the European Athletics Indoor Championships
Shot